Frédéric Pontier (born 10 September 1970) is a French former professional racing cyclist. He rode in the 1996 Tour de France and the 1997 Vuelta a España but did not finish either.

Major results

1992
 2nd Tour de la Somme
1993
 1st Tour de la Somme
1994
 1st Stage 4 Tour du Vaucluse
 9th Overall Étoile de Bessèges
1995
 1st Stage 3 Tour de l'Avenir
 1st Stage 3 Tour du Vaucluse
 4th Road race, National Road Championships
 9th Overall Tour du Limousin
1996
 1st  Overall Tour de Normandie
1st Stages 3 & 5
 9th GP de la Ville de Rennes
1997
 1st Stage 3 Tour du Poitou Charentes et de la Vienne
 5th A Travers le Morbihan
1998
 1st  Overall Tour du Loir-et-Cher
1st Stage 3

References

External links
 

1970 births
Living people
French male cyclists
Sportspeople from Évreux
Cyclists from Normandy
20th-century French people